Knighton was, from 1894 to 1974, a rural district in the administrative county of Radnorshire, Wales.

The district was formed by the Local Government Act 1894, when the existing Knighton Rural Sanitary District was divided into three: the section in Herefordshire was reconstituted as Wigmore Rural District, that in Shropshire as Teme Rural District, while the remaining section in Radnorshire became Knighton Rural District. The rural district council was based in the town of Knighton which was a separate urban district.

The rural district comprised seventeen civil parishes: 

Beguildy
Bleddfa
Cascob
Discoed
Heyope
Knighton
Litton and Cascob
Llananno
Llanbadarn Fynydd
Llanbister
Llanddewi Ystradenny
Llanfihangel Rhydrithon
Llangunllo
Norton
Pilleth
Stanage
Whitton

The district was abolished in 1974 under the Local Government Act 1972, which completely reorganised local administration in England and Wales. Its area became part of the District of Radnor in the new county of Powys.

References

Rural districts of Wales
History of Radnorshire
Radnorshire